Senboku District may refer to:
 Semboku District, Akita (仙北郡)
 Senboku District, Osaka (泉北郡)